Kosal Horizon was an English-language newspaper published from Rourkela, India. Its main focus is the recent happenings in the Western Odisha (claimed as Kosal) area of India. In addition it publishes news of national and international events.

References

External links
 New weekly Kosal Horizon launched in Rourkela

English-language newspapers published in India
Newspapers published in Odisha
Publications with year of establishment missing